Zappacosta is an Italian surname. Notable people with the surname include:
 (Alfredo) Zappacosta (born 1953), Canadian singer
 Davide Zappacosta (born 1992), Italian footballer
 Giacomo Zappacosta (born 1988),  Italian midfielder football player
 Pierluigi Zappacosta (born 1950), founder of Logitech
 Marco Zappacosta (born 1985), founder of Thumbtack

See also
 Costa (surname)

Italian-language surnames